Elliott Ridge is a hook-shaped ridge,  long, extending westward from Wiens Peak in the southern Neptune Range of the Pensacola Mountains in Antarctica. It was mapped by the United States Geological Survey from surveys and U.S. Navy air photos in 1956–66, and was named by the Advisory Committee on Antarctic Names for Commander James Elliott, captain of the icebreaker USS Staten Island which assisted the cargo ship Wyandot through the Weddell Sea pack ice to establish Ellsworth Station on the Filchner Ice Shelf in January 1957.

References 

Ridges of Queen Elizabeth Land